Mitsunori Konnai (近内三孝, Kon'nai Mitsunori, born 14 March 1996) is a Japanese weightlifter. He competed in the men's 67 kg event at the 2020 Summer Olympics in Tokyo, Japan.

He competed in the men's 69 kg event at the 2017 Summer Universiade held in Taipei, Taiwan. He also competed in the men's 69 kg event at the 2017 World Weightlifting Championships held in Anaheim, United States.

In 2018, he represented Japan in the men's 69 kg event at the 2018 Asian Games held in Jakarta, Indonesia.

In 2021, he finished in 6th place in the men's 67 kg event at the 2020 Asian Weightlifting Championships held in Tashkent, Uzbekistan.

References

External links 
 

Living people
1996 births
Place of birth missing (living people)
Japanese male weightlifters
Asian Games competitors for Japan
Weightlifters at the 2018 Asian Games
Olympic weightlifters of Japan
Weightlifters at the 2020 Summer Olympics
21st-century Japanese people